The 2022 World Junior Figure Skating Championships was held from April 13–17, 2022 in Tallinn, Estonia. Figure skaters competed for the title of junior world champion in men's singles, women's singles, pairs, and ice dance. The competition determined the entry quotas for each federation during the 2022–23 ISU Junior Grand Prix series and at the 2023 World Junior Championships.

The competition was originally scheduled to be held in Sofia, Bulgaria from March 7–13, 2022. On February 27, the ISU announced that in light of the COVID-19 pandemic in Bulgaria and the Russian invasion of Ukraine, the event would be unable to be held as scheduled in Bulgaria. Tallinn was announced as the host for the newly scheduled dates on March 4. The city previously had previously hosted the event twice, in 2015 and 2020.

Background 
On February 12, the International Skating Union announced that the event could not be held as planned due to concerns about a surge in omicron variant cases in Bulgaria peaking on the originally scheduled dates, as well as the host nation's restrictive entry requirements. As the 2021 World Junior Championships were already cancelled, the ISU announced that they would evaluate the feasibility of postponing the event until May 2022, if the Bulgarian Skating Federation and other ISU member nations were willing to attend. A final decision was expected to be made at the ISU Council meeting on February 24, but was delayed to allow time to assess the impact of the Russian invasion of Ukraine.

On February 27, the ISU announced that while they were still considering the feasibility of postponing the event to later in the spring, Bulgaria would no longer be available to host and invited other ISU member nations to apply as replacement hosts. The Estonian Skating Union, which had hosted both the European and Four Continents Championships earlier in the season, was the sole applicant.

Qualifications

Age and minimum TES requirements
Skaters who reached the age of 13 before July 1, 2021, but had not turned 19 (singles and females of the other two disciplines) or 21 (male pair skaters and ice dancers) were eligible to compete at the junior level.

The ISU stipulated that the minimum scores must have been achieved at an ISU-recognized junior international competition in the ongoing or preceding two seasons (adjusted from the traditional one due to the pandemic), no later than 21 days before the first official practice day.

Number of entries per discipline 
Normally, the number of entries would be based on the results of the preceding Junior Worlds. However, as the 2021 World Junior Championships were cancelled, the results of the 2020 World Junior Championships were used instead.

Schedule 
No exhibition gala was scheduled.

Entries 
Member nations began announcing their selections in December 2021. The International Skating Union published a complete list of entries on March 25, 2022.

Changes to preliminary entries

Medal summary

Medalists 
Medals awarded to the skaters who achieve the highest overall placements in each discipline:

Small medals awarded to the skaters who achieve the highest short program or rhythm dance placements in each discipline:

Medals awarded to the skaters who achieve the highest free skating or free dance placements in each discipline:

Medals by country 
Table of medals for overall placement:

Table of small medals for placement in the short/rhythm segment:

Table of small medals for placement in the free segment:

Records 

The following new ISU best scores were set during this competition:

Results

Men

Women

Pairs

Ice dance

References

External links 
 World Junior Championships at the International Skating Union

World Junior Figure Skating Championships
World Junior Figure Skating Championships
World Junior Figure Skating Championships
World Junior Figure Skating Championships
International figure skating competitions hosted by Estonia
Sports competitions in Tallinn
World Junior Figure Skating Championships
Sports events postponed due to the COVID-19 pandemic